The Irish League in season 1985–86 comprised 14 teams, and Linfield won the championship.

League standings

Results

References
Northern Ireland - List of final tables (RSSSF)

NIFL Premiership seasons
1985–86 in Northern Ireland association football
Northern